Jane Austen lived her entire life as part of a family located socially and economically on the lower fringes of the English gentry. The Rev. George Austen and Cassandra Leigh, Jane Austen's parents, lived in Steventon, Hampshire, where Rev. Austen was the rector of the Anglican parish from 1765 until 1801. Jane Austen's immediate family was large and close-knit. She had six brothers—James, George, Charles, Francis, Henry, and Edward—and a beloved older sister, Cassandra. Austen's brother Edward was adopted by Thomas and Elizabeth Knight and eventually inherited their estates at Godmersham, Kent, and Chawton, Hampshire. In 1801, Rev. Austen retired from the ministry and moved his family to Bath, Somerset. He died in 1805 and for the next four years, Jane, Cassandra, and their mother lived first in rented quarters and then in Southampton where they shared a house with Frank Austen's family. During these unsettled years, they spent much time visiting various branches of the family. In 1809, Jane, Cassandra, and their mother moved permanently into a large "cottage" in Chawton village that was part of Edward's nearby estate. Austen lived at Chawton until she moved to Winchester for medical treatment shortly before her death in 1817.

Throughout their adult lives, Jane and Cassandra were close to their cousin, Eliza de Feuillide, and to neighbors Mary and Martha Lloyd. Mary became the second wife of Austen's brother James, and Martha lived with the Austen family (beginning shortly after Rev. Austen's death in 1805) and married Austen's brother Frank late in life. Jane and Cassandra were also friends for many years with three sisters, Alethea, Elizabeth and Catherine Bigg, who lived at Manydown Park. Anne Brydges Lefroy, wife of Rev. George Lefroy, "became Jane Austen's best-loved and admired mentor, the person she would always run to for advice and encouragement" after the Lefroys moved to nearby Ashe in 1783. Her death in a riding accident in 1804 left Jane grief-stricken.

Austen met, danced with, and perhaps fell in love with Thomas Lefroy during the Christmas holidays in 1795. However, Lefroy departed to begin his law studies in January 1796 and he and Jane never saw each other again. Samuel Blackall, a Fellow of Emmanuel College, Cambridge, and a friend of Mrs. Anne Lefroy, was seriously interested in marrying Austen in 1797. Austen family tradition holds that Jane and an unnamed young clergyman fell in love while the Austen family visited the seaside at Sidmouth in the summer of 1801. Cassandra is said to have approved of this young man, but he died unexpectedly several months later, before he and Jane could be together again. Austen received her only proposal of marriage from Harris Bigg-Wither, brother of her friends Alethea, Elizabeth and Catherine Bigg, while visiting them at their home in December 1802. Austen at first accepted the proposal, then realized she had made a mistake and withdrew her acceptance the next day. Austen biographer Park Honan suggests that Jane may have received a proposal of marriage from Edward Bridges, a brother of Edward Austen's wife Elizabeth, in 1805, but biographer Claire Tomalin dismisses this claim.

Jane Austen was primarily educated at home by her father and older brothers and through her own reading. Her apprenticeship as a writer lasted from her teenage years until she was about thirty-five years old. During this period, she wrote three major novels and began a fourth. From 1811 until 1815, with the release of Sense and Sensibility (1811), Pride and Prejudice (1813), Mansfield Park (1814), and Emma (1815), she achieved success as a published writer. She wrote two additional novels, Northanger Abbey (originally written in 1798–1799 and revised later) and Persuasion, both published after her death in 1817, and began a third (eventually titled Sanditon), but died before it could be completed. A product of 18th-century literary traditions, Austen's works were influenced most by those of renowned writer and critic Samuel Johnson and novelists Frances Burney and Maria Edgeworth. She considered poet and novelist Sir Walter Scott a rival. Family theatricals, which included plays by Richard Brinsley Sheridan and other 18th-century dramatists, shaped Austen's writing from an early age. William Cowper's poetry was a favourite as were the novels of Samuel Richardson. Austen's engagement with sensibility illustrates her debt to sentimental writers such as Laurence Sterne.

Austen published all of her novels in the Regency period, during which King George III was declared permanently insane and his son was appointed as prince regent, and the novels are firmly rooted in the social context of the time. Throughout most of Austen's adult life, Britain was at war with revolutionary France. Fearing the spread of revolution and violence to Britain, the government tried to repress political radicals by suspending habeas corpus and passing the Seditious Meetings Act and the Treasonable Practices Act, known as the "Gagging Acts". Many reformers still held out hope for change in Britain during the 1790s, but by the first two decades of the 19th century, the French Revolutionary Wars and the Napoleonic Wars had exhausted the country and a deep conservative reaction had set in. While Austen's novels rarely explicitly touch on these events, she herself was personally affected by them, as two of her brothers served in the Royal Navy. When Napoleon was finally defeated at the Battle of Waterloo in 1815, Britain rejoiced. However, economic hardships in the 1810s increased the income disparity in the country and class conflict rose as the Industrial Revolution began.

1760s

1770s

{| class="wikitable"
|- valign="top"

! scope="col" |Year
! scope="col" style="width:31%;"|Austen
! scope="col" style="width:31%;"|Literary history
! scope="col" style="width:31%;"|Political history
|- valign="top"
| scope="row" |1770
|
|
Publication of Goldsmith's poem The Deserted Village
|
January – Frederick, Lord North becomes Prime Minister of Great Britain (1770–1782)
|- valign="top"
| scope="row" |1771
|
8 June – Henry Thomas Austen (Jane's brother) born at Steventon
|
Publication of the first edition of the Encyclopædia Britannica completed (begun 1768)
|
Richard Arkwright opens the first cotton mill in Cromford, Derbyshire, England
|- valign="top"
| scope="row" |1772
|
|
Publication of final volumes of plates of [[Age of Enlightenment|the Philosophes]] Encyclopédie (begun 1751)
|
22 June – Slavery is effectively outlawed in England
|- valign="top"
| scope="row" |1773|
9 January – Cassandra Elizabeth Austen (Austen's sister) born at Steventon
23 March – Rev. Austen becomes rector of Deane parish in addition to Steventon
Pupils live at Steventon from 1773 to 1796
|
|
16 December – American colonists protest against British policies by dumping tea into Boston Harbour
|- valign="top"
| scope="row" |1774|
23 April – Francis (Frank) Austen (Jane's brother) born at Steventon
|
Publication of Goethe's novel The Sorrows of Young Werther
|
May – Louis XVI (pictured) ascends to the throne of France
Warren Hastings becomes the first Governor-General of India
|- valign="top"
| scope="row" |1775|
16 December – Jane Austen born at Steventon
|
 Publication of Samuel Johnson's travel narrative A Journey to the Western Islands of Scotland
|
19 April – American War of Independence begins with the Battle of Lexington (1775–1783)
|- valign="top"
| scope="row" |1776|
|
 Publication of Adam Smith's An Inquiry into the Nature and Causes of the Wealth of Nations
|
|- valign="top"
| scope="row" |1778|
|
Publication of Frances Burney's novel Evelina
Publication of Jean-Jacques Rousseau's Reveries of a Solitary Walker
|
|- valign="top"
| scope="row" |1779'''
|
23 June – Charles Austen (Jane's brother) born at Steventon
3 July – James Austen matriculates at St. John's College, Oxford
|
Publication of Johnson's (pictured) biographies Lives of the Poets (1779–1781)
|
|}

1780s

1790s

1800s

1810s

See also

Timeline of the French Revolution
Napoleonic era

References

Bibliography
Le Faye, Deirdre. A Chronology of Jane Austen and her Family: 1700–2000''. Cambridge: Cambridge University Press, 2006. .

Literature timelines
Personal timelines
Timeline